Shaken-Up Versions is an album by The Knife, featuring "classic Knife tracks reworked especially for the band's recent North American leg of their Shaking the Habitual Tour." The album was released in 2014.

Track listing

References

2014 remix albums
The Knife albums
Mute Records remix albums
Remix albums by Swedish artists